Lowe Avenue Presbyterian Church was a church in the Omaha, Nebraska.

Founded in 1887, the church was built in 1906 at 1023 N 40th Street in the Walnut Hill neighborhood. Situated on the Southeast corner of 40th and Nicholas Streets, the church was organized on July 3, 1887, by a meeting of the people living near West Hamilton Street. Initiative for the meeting had been taken by a committee appointed for the purpose by the Presbytery of Omaha. Originally, the Church was called the West Hamilton Street Presbyterian Church. Rev. W. J. Palm was the first pastor.

The Church held its final worship service on July 5, 2009, after more than 100 years of service to the Omaha Community.

See also 
 Calvin Memorial Presbyterian Church
 Omaha Presbyterian Theological Seminary

References

Sources

https://web.archive.org/web/20110719082951/http://www.mlp.org/article.php?story=20090705055153453

Religious organizations established in 1887
2009 disestablishments in Nebraska
Churches in Omaha, Nebraska
Presbyterian churches in Nebraska
1887 establishments in Nebraska